Agniohammus philippinensis is a species of beetle in the family Cerambycidae. It was described by Stephan von Breuning in 1938. It is known from the Philippines.

References

Lamiini
Beetles described in 1938